The 2007 Copa de la Reina de Fútbol was the 25th edition of the main Spanish women's football cup. It was played between 3 and 30 June 2007 and Levante won its first title ever.

Bracket

References

External links
Results at Arquero-Arba

Copa de la Reina
Women
2006